Workers' Representatives Convention, 1971 is  an International Labour Organization Convention.

It was established in 1971:
Noting the terms of the Right to Organise and Collective Bargaining Convention, 1949, which provides for protection of workers against acts of anti-union discrimination in respect of their employment, and

Considering that it is desirable to supplement these terms with respect to workers' representatives, and

Having decided upon the adoption of certain proposals with regard to protection and facilities afforded to workers' representatives in the undertaking,...

Ratifications
As of August 2013, the convention has been ratified by 85 states.

External links
Text.
Ratifications.

International Labour Organization conventions
Treaties concluded in 1971
Treaties entered into force in 1973
Treaties of Albania
Treaties of Algeria
Treaties of Antigua and Barbuda
Treaties of Argentina
Treaties of Armenia
Treaties of Australia
Treaties of Austria
Treaties of Azerbaijan
Treaties of Barbados
Treaties of Belize
Treaties of Benin
Treaties of Bosnia and Herzegovina
Treaties of Brazil
Treaties of Burkina Faso
Treaties of Burundi
Treaties of Cameroon
Treaties of Chile
Treaties of Chad
Treaties of Costa Rica
Treaties of Croatia
Treaties of Cuba
Treaties of Cyprus
Treaties of the Czech Republic
Treaties of Ivory Coast
Treaties of the Democratic Republic of the Congo
Treaties of Denmark
Treaties of Dominica
Treaties of Egypt
Treaties of El Salvador
Treaties of Estonia
Treaties of Finland
Treaties of France
Treaties of Gabon
Treaties of West Germany
Treaties of Greece
Treaties of Guinea
Treaties of Guyana
Treaties of the Hungarian People's Republic
Treaties of Ba'athist Iraq
Treaties of Italy
Treaties of Jordan
Treaties of Kazakhstan
Treaties of Kenya
Treaties of South Korea
Treaties of Latvia
Treaties of Lesotho
Treaties of Lithuania
Treaties of Luxembourg
Treaties of Mali
Treaties of Malta
Treaties of Mexico
Treaties of Moldova
Treaties of Mongolia
Treaties of Montenegro
Treaties of the Netherlands
Treaties of Morocco
Treaties of Niger
Treaties of Norway
Treaties of the Polish People's Republic
Treaties of the Estado Novo (Portugal)
Treaties of the Socialist Republic of Romania
Treaties of Russia
Treaties of Rwanda
Treaties of São Tomé and Príncipe
Treaties of Senegal
Treaties of Serbia and Montenegro
Treaties of Yugoslavia
Treaties of Slovakia
Treaties of Slovenia
Treaties of Francoist Spain
Treaties of Sri Lanka
Treaties of Suriname
Treaties of Sweden
Treaties of Syria
Treaties of Tanzania
Treaties of North Macedonia
Treaties of Tunisia
Treaties of Turkey
Treaties of Ukraine
Treaties of the United Kingdom
Treaties of Uruguay
Treaties of Uzbekistan
Treaties of the Yemen Arab Republic
Treaties of Zambia
Treaties of Zimbabwe
Treaties extended to Aruba
Treaties extended to the Faroe Islands
Treaties extended to Greenland
Treaties extended to French Guiana
Treaties extended to Guadeloupe
Treaties extended to Martinique
Treaties extended to Réunion
Treaties extended to Bermuda
Treaties extended to Gibraltar
Treaties extended to Guernsey
1971 in labor relations